Elachista sabulella is a moth of the family Elachistidae which is indigenous to California. The name of the species is derived from the Latin sabulum, meaning gravel or sand.

The hindwings are grey and the underside of the wings is also grey.

References

Moths described in 1997
sabulella
Endemic fauna of California
Moths of North America
Fauna without expected TNC conservation status